Jamaica competed at the 2017 World Aquatics Championships in Budapest, Hungary from 14 July to 30 July.

Diving

Jamaica has entered 1 diver (one male).

Swimming

Jamaica has received a Universality invitation from FINA to send two male swimmers to the World Championships.

References

Nations at the 2017 World Aquatics Championships
Jamaica at the World Aquatics Championships
2017 in Jamaican sport